The 1988 Individual Speedway Junior World Championship was the 12th edition of the World motorcycle speedway Under-21 Championships. The event was won by Peter Nahlin of Sweden. It was the first Championship open to all nations, which was why it was renamed the World Under-21 Championship from the European Under-21 Championship.

World final
July 10, 1988
 Slaný, AK Slaný speedway

References

Individual Speedway Junior World Championship
World Individual U-21
World Individual U-21
Speedway competitions in the Czech Republic
Individual Speedway Junior World Championship